Avdetovo is a rural locality (a village) in Budogschskoye Urban Settlement of Kirishsky District, Leningrad Oblast, Russia. The population was 6 as of 2010. There are 3 streets.

Geography 
Avdetovo is located 39 km southeast of Kirishi (the district's administrative centre) by road. Kukuy is the nearest rural locality.

References 

Rural localities in Leningrad Oblast